

243001–243100 

|-id=002
| 243002 Lemmy ||  || Lemmy (1945–2015) was an English musician, singer and songwriter whose music helped set the foundations for the heavy metal genre || 
|-id=073
| 243073 Freistetter ||  ||  (born 1977), an astronomer and science writer. || 
|-id=094
| 243094 Dirlewanger ||  || Wolfgang Dirlewanger (born 1953), leader of dental clinic in Nagold, Germany || 
|-id=096
| 243096 Klauswerner ||  || Klaus Werner (born 1957), German astronomer and professor of astronomy at the University of Tübingen || 
|-id=097
| 243097 Batavia ||  || The fort of Batavia (Castro Batava) was a Roman frontier fort (1st to 5th century AD) in the area of Passau in Bavaria, Germany. || 
|}

243101–243200 

|-id=109
| 243109 Hansludwig ||  ||  (1938–1991), a German physicist and amateur astronomer. From 1976 to 1991, he was the president of the Physical society based in Frankfurt am Main. || 
|}

243201–243300 

|-id=204
| 243204 Kubanchoria ||  || The Kuban Cossack Choir, a folkloric Russian ensemble, was founded on 1811 and named on the occasion of its 200th anniversary on 12 October 2011. || 
|-id=262
| 243262 Korkosz ||  || Frank and John Korkosz, of Chicopee, Massachusetts, were pioneers in the development of mid-sized, high-quality planetariums. || 
|-id=285
| 243285 Fauvaud ||  || Stéphane Fauvaud (born 1968), an active French amateur astronomer || 
|}

243301–243400 

|-id=320
| 243320 Jackuipers ||  || Jack Kuipers (1921–2016), an American aerospace engineer and mathematician. He taught mathematics at Calvin College for 20 years after a 17-year engineering career in the aerospace industry and is known for his book on quaternions: Quaternions and rotation Sequences: a Primer with Applications to Orbits, Aerospace, and Virtual Reality ( Src). || 
|-id=381
| 243381 Alessio ||  || Alessio Muler (born 2002), second son of Argentine-born Spanish amateur astronomer Gustavo Muler, who co-discovered this minor planet || 
|}

243401–243500 

|-id=440
| 243440 Colonia ||  || Colonia (Colonia Claudia Ara Agrippinensium) is the Roman name for Cologne, Germany's fourth-largest city, founded in the year 38 BC by the Romans. || 
|-id=458
| 243458 Bubulina ||  || Marina Denisa Botofan (2008–2010), nicknamed "Bubulina", who lived in Constanta, Romania, and died in Pavia, Italy, of lymphoblastic leukemia. || 
|-id=491
| 243491 Mühlviertel ||  || Muehlviertel, the northernmost of the four districts of Upper Austria. || 
|}

243501–243600 

|-id=516
| 243516 Marklarsen ||  || Mark Larson (born 1962), a senior scientist at the Space Dynamics Laboratory at Utah State University, responsible for the camera aboard the WISE spacecraft || 
|-id=526
| 243526 Russwalker ||  || Russ Walker (born 1931), an astronomer specializing in infrared observations of small Solar System bodies || 
|-id=529
| 243529 Petereisenhardt ||  || Peter Eisenhardt (born 1957) is the project scientist for the WISE mission and a former member of the Spitzer Infrared Array Camera science team. || 
|-id=536
| 243536 Mannheim ||  || Mannheim, a German city in the federal state of Baden-Württemberg || 
|-id=546
| 243546 Fengchuanliu ||  || Fengchuan Liu (born 1965), an expert in cryogenic physics who served as the project manager for the Wide-field Infrared Survey Explorer and NEOWISE projects and who has worked on a number of other NASA low temperature physics experiments || 
|-id=591
| 243591 Ignacostantino ||  || Ignazio Costantino (born 1960), an Italian amateur astronomer, electrionic engineer, and a sailor || 
|}

243601–243700 

|-id=637
| 243637 Frosinone ||  || Named Frusna in ancient Volscan and Frusino by the Romans, Frosinone is a provincial administrative seat and the discoverer's birthplace. || 
|}

243701–243800 

|-bgcolor=#f2f2f2
| colspan=4 align=center | 
|}

243801–243900 

|-bgcolor=#f2f2f2
| colspan=4 align=center | 
|}

243901–244000 

|-bgcolor=#f2f2f2
| colspan=4 align=center | 
|}

References 

243001-244000